Dandi Maulana Abdulhak (born 17 June 1998) is an Indonesian  footballer who plays as a centre-back for Liga 1 club Persija Jakarta.

Club career

Barito Putera
He was signed for Barito Putera to play in Liga 1 in the 2017 season. Dandi made his debut on 22 April 2017 in a match against Persija Jakarta in the Liga 1. On 30 May 2017, Dandi scored his first goal for Barito Putera against Persipura Jayapura in the 31st minute at the Mandala Stadium, Jayapura.

Persebaya Surabaya
Dandi was signed for Persebaya Surabaya to play in Liga 1 in the 2022–23 season. He made his league debut on 25 July 2022 in a match against Persikabo 1973 at the Pakansari Stadium, Cibinong.

Persija Jakarta
Dandi Maulana became Persija Jakarta's first recruit in half of the 2022–23 Liga 1. Dandi made his debut on 15 January 2023 in a match against Bali United at the Patriot Candrabaga Stadium, Bekasi.

Career statistics

Club

Honours

International 
Indonesia U16
 AFF U-16 Youth Championship runner-up: 2013

References

External links
 Dandi Maulana at Soccerway
 Dandi Maulana at Liga Indonesia

1998 births
Living people
Indonesian Muslims
People from Pandeglang Regency
Sportspeople from Banten
Indonesian footballers
Association football defenders
Liga 1 (Indonesia) players
PS Barito Putera players
Persebaya Surabaya players
Indonesia youth international footballers